May 18 (lit. "Splendid Holiday") is a South Korean film released in 2007.

Synopsis
The film is based on the Gwangju massacre on May 18, 1980. It occurred when General Chun Doo-hwan tried to eliminate any rebels by using military force.

Min-woo (Kim Sang-kyung) leads a relatively peaceful life with his younger brother Jin-woo (Lee Joon-gi)—until the day the soldiers go on the rampage against the citizens. The citizens form a militia determined to protect their loved ones, and Min-woo finds himself in the middle of it all.

One day something unexpected happens suddenly. Innocent citizens are assaulted and even killed by martial law army armed with guns and knives.

A tear gas rolls into the theater and a college student jumps into the theater, followed by a soldier. When all the people who watched the movie came out, martial law soldiers beat up college students and beat everyone out of the theater.

Gwangju citizens, who have lost friends, lovers and family members in front of their eyes in an unjust manner, start to form a civic group centering on Heung-soo (Ahn Sung-ki), who retired officer-turned-military officer, and begin a 10-day struggle.

Meanwhile, Jin-woo is angry that his classmate was beaten to death by martial law soldiers when he was not a college student, leading his friends to take the lead in the protest. Min-woo wants to stop his younger brother Jin-woo from taking the lead in the protest. But Jin-woo couldn't stay still, and in the end, Jin-woo was shot in front of Min-woo by martial law soldiers.

The governor of South Jeolla Province shows up on a helicopter to citizens in front of the provincial government to mediate between them. The broadcast was about to withdraw martial law troops until the hour of the day, and the civilian forces believe the words and cheer. Gwangju citizens wait for the right time, but the soldiers do not withdraw at the promised time. As the national anthem is played through the speakers of the provincial government building, citizens salute with their right hand on their left chests, while soldiers sit down and prepare to shoot in a posture at the civilians, and then fire away.

Cast

 Kim Sang-kyung as Kang Min-woo
 Ahn Sung-ki as Park Heung-soo
 Lee Yo-won as Park Shin-ae 
 Lee Joon-gi as Kang Jin-woo
 Park Chul-min as In-bong
 Park Won-sang as Yong-dae
 Song Jae-ho as Priest Kim
 Na Moon-hee as Naju-daek
 Son Byong-ho as Teacher Jung
 Baek Bong-ki as Won-ki
 Jung In-gi as Jin-chul
 Hwang Young-hee as In-bong's wife
 Lee Eol as Lieutenant Colonel Bae
 Choi Jae-hwan as Byung-jo
 Yoo Hyung-kwan as Byung-jo's father
 Im Hyun-sung as Sang-pil
 Park Yong-soo as General Jung
 Kwon Tae-won as General Choi
 Um Hyo-sup as Captain Kim
 Kim Cheol-ki as Corporal Yoo

Awards and nominations
2007 Blue Dragon Film Awards
 Nomination – Best Film
 Nomination – Best Director – Kim Ji-hoon
 Nomination – Best Actor – Kim Sang-kyung
 Nomination – Best Actress – Lee Yo-won
 Nomination – Best Supporting Actor – Park Chul-min
 Nomination – Best Screenplay – Na Hyun
 Nomination – Best Cinematography – Lee Doo-man
 Nomination – Best Art Direction – Park Il-hyun

2007 Korea Movie Star Awards
Best Film
Best Director – Kim Ji-hoon
Best Supporting Actress – Na Moon-hee
Best Tears Award – Kim Sang-kyung

2007 Korean Film Awards
 Nomination – Best Supporting Actor – Park Chul-min
 Nomination – Best Art Direction – Park Il-hyun
 Nomination – Best Visual Effects – Kim Jong-su
 Nomination – Best Sound – Jang Gwang-su

2008 Baeksang Arts Awards
 Nomination – Best Film

2008 Grand Bell Awards
 Nomination – Best Supporting Actor – Park Chul-min

See also
Gwangju Uprising

References

External links
 Official website 
 Official website 
 
 
 

2007 films
2000s war drama films
South Korean war drama films
Films about the Gwangju Uprising
Films about rebellions
Films set in 1980
Films set in Gwangju
Films shot in Gwangju
Films shot in South Jeolla Province
Films about brothers
South Korean films based on actual events
Films directed by Kim Ji-hoon
CJ Entertainment films
2000s Korean-language films
2007 drama films
2000s South Korean films